Patriots Point Soccer Complex is a soccer venue located in Mount Pleasant, South Carolina.  It has been home to the College of Charleston Cougars soccer teams, member of the Division I Colonial Athletic Association, since its opening in fall 2000. Since the 2020 season, the venue has also hosted Charleston Battery of the USL Championship.

The venue is located across Charleston Harbor from the campus of the college. The field was dedicated as Ralph Lundy Field on September 28, 2019 to honor long-time Cougars head coach Ralph Lundy.

In conjunction with the arrival of USL Championship club Charleston Battery to the facility for the 2020 season, the stadium underwent a renovation which increased capacity to 3,900.

References

Sports venues in Charleston County, South Carolina
USL Championship stadiums
Soccer venues in South Carolina